Caulières is a commune in the Somme department in Hauts-de-France in northern France.

Geography 

Population

See also 
 Communes of the Somme department

References 

Communes of Somme (department)